Krzysztof Łągiewka (born 23 January 1983) is a Polish former footballer who played as a defender.

Successes

Skonto Riga

2x Latvian Higher League: 2002, 2003
1x Latvian Football Cup: 2002

Career

Club
In July 2011, he joined Arka Gdynia on a one-year contract.

International
He was a member of Poland's U16 national football team which placed second in the UEFA European U-16 European Championships in 1999. Leo Beenhakker has also called him up twice to the senior Poland national football team but Łągiewka had to pull out on both occasions.

References

External links 
 Krzysztof Łągiewka at jagiellonia.neostrada.pl
 

1983 births
Living people
Polish footballers
Polish expatriate footballers
Association football defenders
Jagiellonia Białystok players
Olimpia Zambrów players
Skonto FC players
FC Shinnik Yaroslavl players
PFC Krylia Sovetov Samara players
FC Kuban Krasnodar players
Arka Gdynia players
Expatriate footballers in Latvia
Expatriate footballers in Russia
Russian Premier League players
Polish expatriate sportspeople in Latvia
People from Kolno
Sportspeople from Podlaskie Voivodeship